Lina Mona Andréa Hurtig (born 5 September 1995) is a Swedish footballer who plays as a forward for Women's Super League club Arsenal and the Sweden national team.

Club career 
After turning 15, Hurtig, who is from Avesta, played the 2011 season in Norrettan with Gustafs GoIF. She scored 14 goals and made four assists in 20 games. At the end of that campaign she was approached by Damallsvenskan clubs LdB FC Malmö and Umeå IK. She joined the latter after a short training spell.

Upon Umeå's relegation following the 2016 season, Hurtig transferred to league champions Linköpings FC on a two-year contract.

On 31 August 2020, Hurtig joined Juventus.

On 18 August 2022, Hurtig joined Arsenal on a permanent transfer.

International career 
As a Swedish under-19 international, Hurtig was featured at the 2012 U-19 European Championship. She started the victorious Swedish team's 1–0 extra time win over Spain in the final.

In December 2012, national team coach Pia Sundhage called up Hurtig to a senior squad training camp at Bosön. Hurtig was also named in the senior squad for a 1–1 friendly draw with Brazil on 19 June 2013. She was hopeful of making the hosts' final squad for UEFA Women's Euro 2013, but was not selected.

After leaving Hurtig out of the final pre-tournament friendly against Norway in May 2013, Sundhage described her as a potentially world class player.

Hurtig won her first senior cap as a substitute in a 1–1 draw with Canada in November 2014.

Hurtig was selected in the Sweden squad that travelled to France for the 2019 FIFA Women's World Cup. She scored her first goal in the tournament in a 5–1 win against Thailand. In July 2021, she was selected in the Sweden squad for the 2020 Summer Olympics. On 21 July, she scored in the 3–0 victory over United States.

Personal life
On 16 August 2019, Lina Hurtig announced that she had married Lisa Lantz, her teammate at Linköpings FC. On 11 June 2021, Hurtig's daughter was born.

Career statistics

International

Scores and results list Sweden's goal tally first, score column indicates score after each Hurtig goal.

Honours 
Linköpings FC
 Damallsvenskan: 2017

Juventus
 Serie A: 2020–21, 2021–22
 Coppa Italia: 
 Supercoppa Italiana: 2020–21, 2021–22
Arsenal

 FA Women's League Cup: 2022–23

Sweden
 UEFA Women's Under-19 Championship: 2012

References

External links 

  (archive)
 
 Umeå IK profile 
 

1995 births
Living people
2019 FIFA Women's World Cup players
Damallsvenskan players
Lesbian sportswomen
LGBT association football players
Association footballers' wives and girlfriends
Swedish LGBT sportspeople
Umeå IK players
Linköpings FC players
People from Avesta Municipality
Sweden women's international footballers
Swedish women's footballers
Women's association football forwards
Women's association football midfielders
Juventus F.C. (women) players
Serie A (women's football) players
Arsenal W.F.C. players
Women's Super League players
Expatriate women's footballers in Italy
Swedish expatriate sportspeople in Italy
Footballers at the 2020 Summer Olympics
Olympic footballers of Sweden
Olympic medalists in football
Medalists at the 2020 Summer Olympics
Olympic silver medalists for Sweden
Sportspeople from Dalarna County
UEFA Women's Euro 2022 players